Charles Lamb (1775–1834) was an English essayist

Charles Lamb may also refer to:
 Charles Lamb (painter) (1893–1964), Irish painter
 Charles Lamb (politician) (1891–1965), Canadian politician
 Charles Lamb (Royal Navy officer) (1914–1981)
 Charles Rollinson Lamb (1860–1942), American architect and artist
 Charles Lamb (cricketer) (born 1972), former English cricketer
 Charles Lamb (actor) (1900–1989), British actor 
 Chuck Lamb, programmer and TV extra, known as the "dead guy"
 Sir Charles Lamb, 2nd Baronet of the Lamb Baronets

See also
 Charles Lamb Kenney (1823–1881), writer
 Charles Lambe (1900–1960), Admiral of the Fleet
 Charles Laverock Lambe (1875–1953), RAF officer